Morningside is a suburb of Auckland, New Zealand. It lies four kilometres south-west of the city centre, close to Eden Park and Western Springs Reserve.

The residential suburb lies between the suburbs of Grey Lynn, Kingsland, Sandringham, and Mount Albert, near the arterial North-Western Motorway and Western Railway line. The name comes from a farm estate called "Morningside" that was subdivided in 1865 for housing lots.

The suburb is centred on the Morningside shops which are located on the New North Road, near the Morningside railway station. One of Morningside's largest buildings is the 1920s brick building which formerly housed the Mount Albert Borough Council until Mt Albert was amalgamated with Auckland City in the late 1980s. St Lukes Shopping Centre is close by. The local Secondary schools are Mount Albert Grammar School, Marist College and St Peter's College.

Morningside was the setting of the animated TV show Bro'Town, and also the album title and hometown of Fazerdaze.

Demographics

Morningside (Auckland) had a population of 3,981 at the 2018 New Zealand census, an increase of 156 people (4.1%) since the 2013 census, and an increase of 375 people (10.4%) since the 2006 census. There were 1,320 households, comprising 1,986 males and 1,995 females, giving a sex ratio of 1.0 males per female. The median age was 32.5 years (compared with 37.4 years nationally), with 495 people (12.4%) aged under 15 years, 1,206 (30.3%) aged 15 to 29, 2,049 (51.5%) aged 30 to 64, and 231 (5.8%) aged 65 or older.

Ethnicities were 68.6% European/Pākehā, 9.0% Māori, 10.2% Pacific peoples, 21.9% Asian, and 3.8% other ethnicities. People may identify with more than one ethnicity.

The percentage of people born overseas was 37.9, compared with 27.1% nationally.

Although some people chose not to answer the census's question about religious affiliation, 53.2% had no religion, 27.8% were Christian, 0.1% had Māori religious beliefs, 5.9% were Hindu, 2.8% were Muslim, 2.0% were Buddhist and 3.6% had other religions.

Of those at least 15 years old, 1,593 (45.7%) people had a bachelor's or higher degree, and 204 (5.9%) people had no formal qualifications. The median income was $46,000, compared with $31,800 nationally. 936 people (26.9%) earned over $70,000 compared to 17.2% nationally. The employment status of those at least 15 was that 2,265 (65.0%) people were employed full-time, 477 (13.7%) were part-time, and 165 (4.7%) were unemployed.

References

 The Heart Of Colonial Auckland 1865-1910, Terence Hodgson. Random Century 1992.

External links
Photographs of Morningside held in Auckland Libraries' heritage collections.

Suburbs of Auckland